Leigh Hunt (1784–1859) was an English essayist and poet.

Leigh Hunt may also refer to:

 Thornton Leigh Hunt (1810–1873), English journalist, first editor of The Daily Telegraph
 Leigh S. J. Hunt (1855–1933), American entrepreneur
 Ronald Leigh-Hunt (1920–2005), British actor
 Barbara Leigh-Hunt (b. 1935), English actor
 Mabel Leigh Hunt (1892–1971), American writer
 Leigh Hunt (?–2007), person and character referred to in 17 books by Clive Cussler

See also
 Leigh Hunt Glacier, a place-name
Lee Hunt (disambiguation)